Duncan Ranch Colony is a Hutterite community and census-designated place (CDP) in Wheatland County, Montana, United States. The Musselshell River flows eastward through the colony.

The community was first listed as a CDP prior to the 2020 census.

Demographics

Education
It is zoned to Harlowton Public Schools.

References 

Census-designated places in Wheatland County, Montana
Census-designated places in Montana
Hutterite communities in the United States